Grant-Lee Hall is a historic two-and-a-half-story building on the campus of Lincoln Memorial University in Harrogate, Tennessee. It was built in 1917 on the limestone foundations of a prior building completed in 1892, and it was designed in the Romanesque Revival architectural style. It "occupies the most prominent position" on the LMU campus. It has been listed on the National Register of Historic Places since December 8, 1978.

References

National Register of Historic Places in Claiborne County, Tennessee
Romanesque Revival architecture in Tennessee
School buildings completed in 1917
Lincoln Memorial University
1917 establishments in Tennessee